The 1919 Ontario general election, held on October 20, 1919, elected 111 Members of the 15th Legislative Assembly of Ontario ("MLAs"). The United Farmers of Ontario captured the most seats but only a minority of the legislature. They joined with 11 Labour MPPs and three others to form a coalition government, ending the 14-year rule of Ontario's Conservatives. This is one of the few examples of coalition government in Canadian history.

Premier William Howard Hearst had aimed to win a fifth consecutive term for the Conservatives, but instead the party became the first in Ontario history to fall from first to third place. As newspaperman John Willison later remarked, "There could not have been a worse time for a general election."

Campaign
The parties tended to have a targeted approach in fielding their candidates:

It was the first in which women could vote and run for office. Election day was also held on the same day as the scheduled referendum on prohibition.

Conservatives
Hearst alienated the business community with his progressive policies; he had a rift with Adam Beck (London) over the direction of the Ontario Hydro-Electric Commission; and his promotion of prohibition alienated the urban "wets".

Only the Conservatives attempted to field a full slateand were helped by having four candidates being declared elected by acclamationbut about two dozen incumbents decided to step aside in favour of the local farmer candidates.

Seventeen Conservative MLAs either retired from the Legislature, or had failed to be renominated. Arthur Pratt (Norfolk South) opted to campaign as an Independent-Conservative, claiming earlier in the year that at least 27 MLAs privately opposed Hearst's prohibition policy.

Beck also decided to stand as an Independent, saying, "I do not object to the Government having a control of the Hydro enterprise, but I object to its becoming a Government department; only as an Independent can I look after the interests of Hydro-Electric Power for the people of the Province in the most efficient manner."

Liberals
The Liberals split between those still loyal to former leader Newton Rowell and his successor William Proudfoot (Huron Centre), and those who supported the new leader, Hartley Dewart. John Campbell Elliott (Middlesex West) (who had come in 3rd in the 1919 leadership contest), joined by five others, decided to drop out of the race.

They tried to avoid direct contests with UFO candidates, fielding candidates in only 66 ridings as opposed to the 90 named in the 1914 election. In many respects, however, they underestimated the discontent that was simmering among rural Ontarians, and Dewart focused his attention unnecessarily against the Conservative campaign manager George Howard Ferguson.

Proudfoot opted to campaign as an Independent.

United Farmers
The UFO focused on rural areas. Its leader, R.H. Halbert, did not campaign, as he had been elected to the House of Commons of Canada in an earlier by-election. It had only two incumbent MPPs, Beniah Bowman and John Wesley Widdifield, who had entered the legislature by winning by-elections in Manitoulin and Ontario North.

Labour
The labour political movement was fragmented between the Independent Labour Party, the Ontario section of the Canadian Labour Party, and the Ontario Labour Educational Association and its newspaper The Industrial Banner. The ILP was the effective organization on the campaign trail that year, and it promoted joint action with the UFO.

Media in the campaign
Media support in the campaign was mixed. The Globe and The Toronto Star, at that time both Liberal in outlook, were hostile against Dewart because of his stand on temperance issues. The Toronto World, generally a Conservative backer, pursued a simmering scandal from 1916 concerning International Nickel and alleged provincial support of wartime shipments of the metal to Germany via the cargo submarine Deutschland. The Farmer's Sun, recently acquired by the UFO, was an enthusiastic promoter of farmer policies.

Synopsis of results

Impact
The result was highly skewed as a result of the way the ridings were drawn up. The Ottawa Journal noted, "The arrangement of electoral districts in Ontario (and throughout Canada) is such that a farmer’s vote has practically twice the effect of the vote of any person resident in cities or large towns. Ottawa, for instance, with 110,000 population elects two members to the Ontario Legislature; Carleton County on one side  with 20,000 people elects one member; Russell County on the other side has a population of 40,000 and elects one member."

The UFO emerged from the vote with the largest bloc of seats, joining the eleven Labour MLAs to form a coalition government.  Liberal-UFO MLA David James Taylor of Grey North, "Soldier" MLA Joseph McNamara of Riverdale and Labour-UFO MLA Karl Homuth of Waterloo South were also members of the governing caucus giving Drury's coalition 58 seats in total, a slight majority.

The Ontario Liberal Party, led by Hartley Dewart, increased the size of its caucus by a small number, despite turning over more than half the seats held.  The Conservative Party lost ground to all other parties.

The election had several sweeping results:

 only about two dozen MPPs from the previous Legislative Assembly were re-elected;
 notably, Conservative William Hearst was defeated by a Labour candidate;
 Beck and Proudfoot were also defeated by Labour candidates, despite the decision of the Conservatives and Liberals not to contest the seats;
 three clergymen were elected;
 eighteen returned soldiers were elected; and
 all anti-Prohibition candidates were defeated.

Upon hearing the news of the Conservative defeat, Hearst noted:

Three days after the election, James J. Morrison, Secretary of the UFO, reported on the way he had addressed the need to form a working majority in the chamber. He released the following statement:

Ernest C. Drury agreed to lead the new government as Premier of Ontario, and a UFO-Labour coalition cabinet was formed. Although he was Vice-President of the UFO, Drury had not been a candidate in the election and had to run in a by-election to enter the legislature following his appointment to the office of Premier.

Results overview

|-
! colspan=2 rowspan=2 | Political party
! rowspan=2 | Party leader
! colspan=5 | MPPs
! colspan=3 | Votes
|-
! Candidates
!1914
!Dissol.
!1919
!±
!#
!%
! ± (pp)
|-
|rowspan="7" |  
|style="text-align:left;" colspan="10"|UFO-Labour Coalition
|-
|style="text-align:left;" |
|style="text-align:left;"|–
|66
|–
|2
|44
|44
|248,274
|20.97%
|
|-
|style="text-align:left;" |
|style="text-align:left;"|Walter Rollo
|21
|1
|1
|11
|10
|107,588
|9.09%
|7.75
|-
|style="text-align:left;" |
|style="text-align:left;"|
|5
|–
|–
|1
|1
|27,841
|2.35%
|
|-
|style="text-align:left;" |
|style="text-align:left;"|
|2
|–
|–
|1
|1
|7,448
|0.63%
|
|-
|style="text-align:left;" |
|style="text-align:left;"|
|2
|–
|–
|1
|1
|9,618
|0.81%
|
|-
|style="text-align:left;" colspan="5"|Coalition Total
|58
|
|400,679
|33.85%
|

|style="text-align:left;"|Hartley Dewart
|66
|24
|27
|27
|3
|301,995
|25.51%
|12.41

|style="text-align:left;"|William Hearst
|103
|84
|79
|25
|59
|403,655
|34.09%
|19.78

|style="text-align:left;"|
|1
|1
|1
|1
|
|5,354
|0.45%
|0.01

|style="text-align:left;"|Liberal-Temperance
|style="text-align:left;"|
|–
|1
|1
|–
|1
|colspan="3"|Did not campaign

|style="text-align:left;"|
|14
|–
|–
|–
|–
|48,244
|4.07%
|3.08

|style="text-align:left;"|
|3
|–
|–
|–
|–
|14,213
|1.20%
|0.81

|style="text-align:left;"|
|2
|–
|–
|–
|–
|9,088
|0.77%
|

|style="text-align:left;"|
|3
|–
|–
|–
|–
|637
|0.05%
|0.87
|-style="background:#E9E9E9;"
|colspan="3" style="text-align:left;"|Total
|288
|111
|111
|111
|
|1,183,955
|100.00%
|
|-
|colspan="8" style="text-align:left;"|Blank and invalid ballots
|align="right"|50,810
|style="background:#E9E9E9;" colspan="2"|
|-style="background:#E9E9E9;"
|colspan="8" style="text-align:left;"|Registered voters / turnout
|1,443,746
|85.53%
|21.10
|}

Results by riding

Italicized names indicate members returned by acclamation. Two-tone colour boxes indicate ridings that turned over from the 1914 election, eg, 

 Central Ontario

 Eastern Ontario

 Hamilton/Halton/Niagara

 Midwestern Ontario

 Northeastern Ontario

 Northwest Ontario

 Southwestern Ontario

 Toronto

 York/Peel/Ontario

Analysis

Seats that changed hands

There were 77 seats that changed allegiance in the election:

(* - open seats, # - byelection gains held, ^ - change of affiliation)

(Riding names in italics did not have Liberal candidates. Riding names in bold did not have Conservative candidates.)

 Conservative to UFO
Carleton*
Dufferin*
Dundas
Durham East
Elgin East*
Elgin West
Grey Centre
Grey South
Haldimand
Halton
Hastings East
Huron South*
Lambton East
Lambton West*
Lanark North
Lanark South*
Manitoulin#
Middlesex East*
Norfolk South
Northumberland East*
Ontario North#
Oxford South
Perth South*
Peterborough East
Renfrew North
Renfrew South
Simcoe Centre*
Simcoe East
Simcoe South
Victoria North
Victoria South*
Wellington West
Wentworth North*
Wentworth South

 Conservative to Labour
Fort William
Hamilton West*
Kenora
London
Niagara Falls
Sault Ste. Marie
St. Catharines

 Conservative to Farmer-Labour
Waterloo South

 Conservative to Farmer-Liberal
Grey North*

 Conservative to Soldier
Riverdale*

 Conservative to Liberal
Algoma
Brockville
Bruce South
Durham West
Kent West*
Nipissing
Ontario South
Parry Sound
Perth North#
Stormont*
Toronto Northwest - B
Toronto Southeast - A*
Toronto Southeast - B*
Toronto Southwest - A#
Toronto Southwest - B*
Welland

 Conservative to Independent-Liberal
Waterloo North

 Liberal to UFO
Brant*
Bruce North
Essex North*
Essex South
Glengarry*
Kent East*
Middlesex North
Middlesex West*
Norfolk North*
Wellington East

 Liberal to Labour
Brant South*
Huron Centre
Peterborough West

 Liberal to Conservative
Ottawa West

 Independent-Liberal to Liberal
Prescott^

 Liberal-Temperance to Conservative
Wellington South

Notable groups of candidates

(* - incumbent; † - chaplain; ‡ - Anti-Prohibition)

Cooke was the only acclaimed candidate who had not previously been an incumbent.

See also

Politics of Ontario
List of Ontario political parties
Premier of Ontario
Leader of the Opposition (Ontario)

Notes and references

Notes

References

Further reading
 
 
 
 
 

1919 elections in Canada
1919
1919 in Ontario
October 1919 events